Confederacy or confederate may refer to:

States or communities
 Confederate state or confederation, a union of sovereign groups or communities
 Confederate States of America, a confederation of secessionist American states that existed between 1861 and 1865
 Military forces of the Confederate States, the Army, Marine Corps, and Navy of the Confederacy
 Confederate Ireland, a period of Irish self-government during the Eleven Years' War
 Canadian Confederation, the 1867 union of three British provinces (United Canada, split into Ontario and Quebec; Nova Scotia, and New Brunswick) as "one dominion under the name of Canada." Today, there are 10 provinces and three territories, and Canada (since 1982) is no longer a dominion.
 Confederation of the Rhine, a group of French client states that existed during the Napoleonic Wars
 Catalan-Aragonese Confederation, a group of Spanish states that were governed by one king
 Gaya confederacy, an ancient grouping of territorial polities in southern Korea
 German Confederation, an association of German-speaking states prior to German Unification
 Iroquois Confederacy,  group of united Native American nations in present-day Canada and the United States
 Maratha Confederacy, a group of Indian states in the 1700s
 Muscogee Confederacy, Native American nation in Southern United States
 North German Confederation, a federation in northern Germany from 1867 to 1870
 Peru–Bolivian Confederation, a federation of several states in present day Peru and Bolivia that existed between 1836 and 1839
 Powhatan Confederacy, a group of Native American tribes on the Atlantic coast governed by a single chief
 Sikh Confederacy, a group of states confederated during the 18th century in the Punjab region
 Swiss Confederation or Switzerland, a federal republic in Europe
 Old Swiss Confederacy, a confederation that was the predecessor of the current Swiss state
 Three Confederate States of Gojoseon, states thought to have existed in present day Korea during the Bronze Age
 Northwestern Confederacy, a group of Native American tribes in the Great Lakes region that united after the American revolution

Fictional confederacies
 Breen Confederacy, a political entity in the Star Trek universe
 Capellan Confederation, a political entity in the Battletech universe
 Galactic Confederacy, part of the Scientology mythos
 Terran Confederacy, a political entity in the StarCraft universe
 Terran Confederation (Wing Commander), a political entity in the Wing Commander universe
 Confederacy of Independent Systems, a secessionist political entity in the Star Wars universe

Other uses
 Confederacy (British political group), a society within the British Conservative Party during the early twentieth century
 Confederates (novel), a novel by Thomas Keneally
 Confederate (TV series), a cancelled HBO television program

See also
 Confederation (disambiguation)
 A Confederacy of Dunces, a novel written by John Kennedy Toole, published in 1980
 Condica confederata or the confederate, a moth in the family Noctuidae
 Confederate Motors, an American manufacturer of motorcycles
 Battle of the Confederates, a battle in early Muslim history
 Chevrolet Series BA Confederate, an automobile manufactured in 1932
 Federacy, where one or several states or regions enjoy considerably more independence than the majority 
 Federation, a union comprising a number of partially self-governing states or regions united by a central government
 Baro Bhuyans, confederacies of soldier-landowners in Assam and Bengal in late middle age and early modern period